The Dubuque Millworking Historic District  is a nationally recognized historic district located in Dubuque, Iowa, United States.  It was listed on the National Register of Historic Places in 2008.  At the time of its nomination it consisted of 24 resources, which included 19 contributing buildings, and five contributing structures.  Made up of large industrial buildings, the district represents the period of transition when Dubuque went from lumber production to millwork production.  The buildings are associated with two local millworking firms, Carr, Ryder & Adams and Farley Loetscher.  All of the buildings are brick construction, and are between two and five stories in height.  Decorative features include pavilions, pilasters, large entry arches, decorative pediments and parapets.  Two of the buildings fill an entire block, while three cover a half block.  The most substantial buildings were built between 1881 and 1924.

References

National Register of Historic Places in Dubuque, Iowa
Historic districts in Dubuque, Iowa
Historic districts on the National Register of Historic Places in Iowa
Industrial buildings and structures on the National Register of Historic Places in Iowa